Elyria Township is one of the eighteen townships of Lorain County, Ohio, United States. As of the 2010 census the population was 3,266.

Geography
Located in northern Lorain County, it borders the following townships and cities:
Lorain - northwest and north
Sheffield Township - north
Elyria - east
Carlisle Township - south
New Russia Township - southwest corner
Amherst Township - west

No municipalities are located in Elyria Township, other than the city of Elyria, which has annexed the majority of the township.

Name and history
It is the only Elyria Township statewide. Elyria Township is named for Heman Ely, an early settler.

Government
The township is governed by a three-member board of trustees, who are elected in November of odd-numbered years to a four-year term beginning on the following January 1. Two are elected in the year after the presidential election and one is elected in the year before it. There is also an elected township fiscal officer, who serves a four-year term beginning on April 1 of the year after the election, which is held in November of the year before the presidential election. Vacancies in the fiscal officership or on the board of trustees are filled by the remaining trustees.

References

External links

County website

Townships in Lorain County, Ohio
Townships in Ohio